Alexander Wang may refer to:

Alexander Lee-Hom Wang or Wang Leehom (born 1976), Taiwanese-American musician
Alexander Wang (designer) (born 1983), Taiwanese-American fashion designer
Alexandr Wang (born 1997), CEO of Scale AI